Shaharizukirnain bin Abdul Kadir (Jawi شاهرالذوالقرنين عبدالقدير; born 22 November 1969) is a Malaysian politician and is the chairman of the Tabung Ekonomi Kumpulan Usahawan Niaga Nasional (TEKUN Nasional) government-linked company.

Election results

References

Living people
People from Terengganu
Malaysian people of Malay descent
Members of the Dewan Rakyat
21st-century Malaysian politicians
Malaysian Islamic Party politicians
1969 births